The 1932–33 season was West Ham's first season back in the Second Division following their relegation in the previous season. The club were managed at the start of the season by Syd King.

Season summary
Two days after losing their ninth game of the season, on 7 November King was sacked. He was replaced by Charlie Paynter. King who was reputed to have had problems with alcohol and had previously turned up at board meetings drunk and had taken West Ham's relegation the previous season badly such that it had affected his mental health. A month after his sacking, King committed suicide by drinking alcohol laced with a "corrosive substance". An inquest into his death concluded that he had been suffering from paranoia and that he had taken his life "whilst of unsound mind".

In the league, they finished in 20th place just one place above a relegation spot having not been higher than 16th all season. Their defence was the poorest in the league ranking 22nd letting in 93 goals at an average of 2.21 goals every game. A run of four wins in their last five games moved them out of the relegation places with one game of the season remaining. This included their only away win of the season, at Old Trafford against Manchester United. The winning goal in a 2-1 victory was scored by Arthur Wilson who many years later recalled the goal; "It was a real belter from 30 yards. The ball hit the underside of the bar and struck the goalkeeper on the back of the neck before crossing the line. The force of the shot knocked him to the floor". The players were promised a continental tour if they managed to beat relegation. This did not materialize.

The club's top scorer was Vic Watson with 28 goals; 24 in the league and four in the FA Cup.

West Ham reached the semi-final of the FA Cup before losing to Everton whose goals were scored by Dixie Dean and Ted Critchley. Everton went on to contest, and win, an all Lancashire final against Manchester City.

Second Division

Results
West Ham United's score comes first

Legend

Football League Second Division

FA Cup

Squad

References

West Ham United F.C. seasons
1932 sports events in London
1933 sports events in London
West Ham United